José Márcio da Costa (born 4 July 1983), known as Márcio Mossoró, is a Brazilian footballer who plays as a midfielder for Associação Cultural e Desportiva Potiguar.

His nickname stemmed for his birthplace. He spent most of his professional career in Portugal, representing mainly Braga where he appeared in 175 official matches over five seasons. In 2014 he signed with İstanbul Başakşehir from Turkey, where he also endured a lengthy spell.

Club career
Born in Mossoró, Rio Grande do Norte, Mossoró began his professional career at Ferroviário Atlético Clube (CE) in 1999, before moving for Santa Catarina Clube and then Paulista Futebol Clube. Shortly after, he broke into the first team, and helped to qualification for the final of the Campeonato Paulista, being defeated by Associação Desportiva São Caetano.

In 2005, Mossoró played a key role for the side as they won the Brazilian Cup. He was then transferred to Sport Club Internacional of Porto Alegre for the second half of the season, making his Série A debut in the process.

Mossoró was loaned to C.S. Marítimo of Portugal in July 2007. His performances, which included braces in Primeira Liga wins against Associação Naval 1º de Maio (3–0) and S.C. Braga (4–1) were impressive enough to earn him a permanent €1 million deal with the latter club, which signed the player to a four-year contract at the end of the campaign.

During his first two years at Braga, Mossoró was a very important first-team member when available, helping the Minho side finish in a best-ever runner-up position in 2009–10. Following a 31 October 2009 scuffle at the end of the 2–0 home win against S.L. Benfica – with his team then in the lead – he was also suspended for three games and also suffered a serious injury in the final stretch, with Braga eventually being surpassed in the table by that opponent.

Mossoró left Braga in June 2013, aged 30. Subsequently, he represented Al-Ahli SC (Jeddah), İstanbul Başakşehir F.K. and Göztepe SK, with the last two clubs hailing from the Turkish Süper Lig.

Honours
Paulista
Copa do Brasil: 2005

Internacional
Copa Libertadores: 2006
Recopa Sudamericana: 2007

Braga
Taça da Liga: 2012–13
UEFA Europa League runner-up: 2010–11

References

External links

1983 births
Living people
People from Mossoró
Sportspeople from Rio Grande do Norte
Brazilian footballers
Association football midfielders
Campeonato Brasileiro Série A players
Campeonato Brasileiro Série B players
Ferroviário Atlético Clube (CE) players
Paulista Futebol Clube players
Sport Club Internacional players
América Futebol Clube (RN) players
Primeira Liga players
C.S. Marítimo players
S.C. Braga players
Saudi Professional League players
Al-Ahli Saudi FC players
Süper Lig players
TFF First League players
İstanbul Başakşehir F.K. players
Göztepe S.K. footballers
Altay S.K. footballers
Brazilian expatriate footballers
Expatriate footballers in Portugal
Expatriate footballers in Saudi Arabia
Expatriate footballers in Turkey
Brazilian expatriate sportspeople in Portugal
Brazilian expatriate sportspeople in Saudi Arabia
Brazilian expatriate sportspeople in Turkey